Charles McGregor Robertson Gilmour (born 17 February 1942) is a Scottish retired amateur football full back who made over 200 appearances in the Scottish League for Queen's Park.

References

Scottish footballers
Scottish Football League players
Queen's Park F.C. players
Association football fullbacks
1942 births
Living people
Footballers from Glasgow
Scotland amateur international footballers